The World War Adjusted Compensation Act, or Bonus Act, was a United States federal law passed on May 19, 1924, that granted a benefit to veterans of American military service in World War I.

Provisions
The act awarded veterans additional pay in various forms, with only limited payments available in the short term. The value of each veteran's "credit" was based on each recipient's service in the United States Armed Forces between April 5, 1917, and July 1, 1919, with $1.00 awarded for each day served in the United States and $1.25 for each day served abroad. It set maximum payments at $500 (approximately $8,000 in 2021 dollars) for a veteran who served stateside and $625 for a veteran who served overseas. Most officers and anyone whose service began after November 11, 1918, were excluded.

It authorized immediate payments to anyone due less than $50. The estate of a deceased veteran could be paid his award immediately if the amount was less than $500. All others were awarded an "Adjusted Service Certificate," which functioned like an insurance policy. Based on standard actuarial calculations, the value of a veteran's certificate was set as the value of a 20-year insurance policy equal to 125 percent of the value of his service credit. Certificates were to be awarded on the veteran's birthday no earlier than January 1, 1925, and redeemable in full on his birthday in 1945, with payments to his estate if he died before then. Certificate holders were allowed to use them as collateral for loans under certain restrictions.

Enactment

The American Legion was a principal proponent of the legislation on behalf of World War I veterans, and it objected to the term bonus, because "bonus has come to mean 'full payment plus,' and there has not yet been full payment, or anywhere near full payment, so there cannot be any plus." The Legion said that the government needed to "restore the faith of men sorely tried by what they feel to be National ingratitude and injustice." The Legion pointed out that the Wilson administration had made additional payments to government workers in 1917–18 to help offset the effects of inflation, without making any comparable provision for members of the military.

The Legion fought President Warren G. Harding as his position changed from supporting payments if paired with a revenue measure, to supporting a future pension system. Harding felt so strongly about the issue that he visited the Senate to make his case against one version of the bill in 1921, and the Senate voted it down 47–29. Harding vetoed another version of the Adjusted Compensation Act on September 19, 1922, and the House overrode his veto 258–54 but the Senate failed to override by four votes on a vote that split both Democrats and Republicans. Harding's veto of the popular measure particularly alienated the Senate Republicans, who thought the President's defense of fiscal integrity endangered the party's electoral prospects.

Harding died before the issue was taken up again by Congress.  In preliminary negotiations between Congress and President Calvin Coolidge, it became clear that the President would veto any law that proposed immediate cash payments to veterans and that the Senate would sustain that veto. The legislation, popularly called the Insurance Bill, provided the veteran instead with a variety of future payment scenarios rather than cash in the short term.

On May 15, 1924, Coolidge vetoed a bill granting bonuses to veterans of World War I saying: "patriotism... bought and paid for is not patriotism." Congress overrode his veto a few days later.

The act was amended with respect to minor details on July 3, 1926.

Later history
Veterans were able to take out loans against their certificates beginning in 1927. By June 30, 1932, more than 2.5 million veterans had borrowed $1.369 billion.

In 1936, the Adjusted Compensation Payment Act (January 27, 1936, ch. 32, 49 Stat. 1099) replaced the 1924 Act's service certificates with bonds issued by the Treasury Department that could be redeemed at any time.

See also
Bonus Army

References

Footnotes

Bibliography
American Red Cross, "World War Adjusted Compensation Act," updated: July 19, 1926, 363–74, Available online", accessed January 30, 2017
Niall A. Palmer, The Twenties in America: Politics and History (Edinburgh University Press, 2006)

1924 in American law
68th United States Congress
Aftermath of World War I in the United States
History of the American Legion
History of veterans' affairs in the United States
Presidency of Calvin Coolidge
United States federal veterans' affairs legislation
World War I legislation